The Trans Europe Foot Race is a multiday long-distance ultramarathon that consists of running across Europe.

2003 race
The 2003 Trans Europe Foot Race was organized by Ingo Schultze. Out of 44 starters, there were 22 finishers including one wheelchair athlete, with Mariko Sakamoto the only woman to finish. The event was won by Robert Wimmer from Germany.

2009 race
The 2009 Trans Europe Foot Race was also organized by Ingo Schultze.
The route started in Bari, Italy and finished in North Cape, Norway. It mostly avoided big cities and passed for example Foggia, Fano, Schlanders, Seeg, Waldkappel before using the ferry Kiel-Gothenburg, and then passing for example Kristinehamn, Sveg, Storuman, Jokkmokk, Enontekiö and Alta. Again this was a 64-day race. The race began on April 19, 2009 and ended on June 21, 2009.

The male winner was Rainer Koch from Germany with a running time of 378 hours and 12 minutes. The female winner was Takako Furuyama from Japan, with a running time of 529 hours and 6 minutes. 45 runners finished the race.

List of competitors for 2009 race

From Germany:
Hermann Böhm (Weiherhammer)
Hans Damm (Neu-Isenburg)
Sigrid Eichner (Berlin) Female
Dagmar Großheim (Gräfenberg) Female
Joachim Hauser (Dettenhausen)
Martina Hausmann (Würzburg) Female
Marcel Heinig (Cottbus)
Achim Heukemes (Gräfenberg)
Richard Hofbauer (Rosenheim)
Theo Huhnholt (Waldkraiburg)
Heinz Jäckel (Hennef)
Rainer Koch (Dettelbach)
Jörg Koenig (Stade)
Klaus Neumann (Stuttgart)
Heike Pawzik (Rostock) Female
Hans-Jürgen Schlotter (Horb-Bittelbronn)
Werner Selch (Amberg)
Elke Streicher (Gerlingen) Female
René Strosny (Filderstadt)
Bernd Wagner (Duisburg)
Klaus Wanner (Holzgerlingen)
Robert Wimmer (Nürnberg / Bayern)
Tom Wolter-Roessler (Ulm-Böfingen)
Ullrich Zach (Rödental)
Jürgen Zuth (Siegelsbach)
From Finland:
Janne Kankaansyrjä (Järvenpää)
From France:
Gèrard Denis (Fouesnant)
Jean-Herve Duchesne (Saint-Germain)
Alain Lemarchand (Neuric sur I'Isle)
Christophe Midelet (Gizy / Aisne)
Stephane Pelissier (Lanta)
Fabrice Viaud (Rezè)
Roger Warenghem (Le Touvet)
From Japan:
Kenji Hara (Utsunomiya, Tochigi)
Kazuhiko Horiguchi (Kitakata, Fukushima)
Kazuko Kaihata (Kurashiki, Okayama) Female
Yasuo Kanai (Yokohama, Kanagawa)
Saeko Kishimoto (Gunma) Female
Shoji Konoeda (Osaka)
Shigeru Mitsuhashi (Sapporo, Hokkaido)
Koji Nakamura (Higashi Yodagawa)
Yasumasa Namikoshi (Osaka)
Hiroko Okiyama (Fussa, Tokio) Female
Takasumi Senoo (Yokohama)
Tsuyoshi Sugawara (Hasuda, Saitama)
Furuyama Takako (Tokyo) Female
Okuno Tomoko (Tokyo) Female
From Korea:
Ahn Byeung Sik (Seogwipo)
From Netherlands:
Ria Buiten (Biddinghuize) Female
Theo Cloosterman (Veldhoven)
Jenni De Groot (Leeuwarden) Female
Ubel Dijk (Drachten)
Theo Kuijpers (Westerbeek)
Jan Nabuurs (Westerbeck)
Cor Westhuis (Dalfsen)
From Norway:
Eiolf Eivindsen (Mosjøen)
Trond Sjavik (Mosjøen)
Henry Wehder (Nordre Toten/Nordli)
From Sweden:
Matthias Bramstång (Halmstad)
Andreas Falk (Sollentuna)
From Switzerland:
Markus Bernhard (Thunstetten)
Christian Fatton (Noiraigue)
Christian Marti (Zürich)
Martin Wagen (Biel-Benke)
From Taiwan:
Ching-Hui Chen (Taipei)
From Turkey:
Mike Friedl (Istanbul)
From USA:
Russell Secker (Austin,Texas)

2012 race
The race was run again in 2012. It went from Skagen, Denmark to Gibraltar, passing e.g. Haderslev, Ahrensburg, Waldkappel, Frankenbach, Valdoie, Bourganeuf, St-Pons-de-Thomieres, Berga, Teruel and Puente Genil. The total distance was 4175 km and the race took 64 days. The male winner was Peter Bartel from Germany with 354:25:21, and the female winner was Ria Buiten from the Netherlands with 504:18:29.

2021 race
In 2021 a new edition of this multiday event, the Race Across Europe (RAE), will take place. The event is organised by Oliver Witzke and is 64 stages from Tallinn to Lisbon and approximately 4750 km.

See also
Transcontinental walk

References

External links
Trans-Europe Footrace 2003
Trans-Europe 2009/2012
Multiday News
depasseur-de-bornes
ULTRAmarathonRunning.com Global Ultramarathon Races & Events Calendar
 Trans-Europe Footrace Archives
Race Across Europe (RAE)

Multiday races
Cross-border races